James Peter Sartain (born June 6, 1952), better known as Peter Sartain, is an American prelate of the Roman Catholic Church. He served as the fifth archbishop of the Archdiocese of Seattle in Washington State from 2010 to 2019.

He previously served as bishop of the Diocese of Little Rock in Arkansas (2000–2006) and as bishop of the Diocese of Joliet in Illinois (2006–2010).

Biography

Early life 
Peter Sartain was born on June 6, 1952, in Memphis, Tennessee, to Joseph Martin ("Pete") and Catherine (née Poole) Sartain. He is the youngest of five children as well as the only boy. His father served in the U.S. Navy in the Pacific Theater during World War II. Raised in the Whitehaven neighborhood of Memphis, Peter Sartain received his early education at the parochial school of St. Paul the Apostle Parish, and graduated from Bishop Byrne High School in Memphis in 1970.

Sartain studied chemistry at Memphis State University for one year before transferring to St. Meinrad College in St. Meinrad, Indiana, earning a Bachelor of Arts degree in English in 1974. Sartain then went to Rome to study at Pontifical University of St. Thomas Aquinas Angelicum, receiving a Bachelor of Sacred Theology degree in 1977.

Priesthood 
On July 15, 1978, Sartain was ordained to the priesthood for the Diocese of Memphis by Bishop Carroll Dozier at the Cathedral of the Immaculate Conception in Memphis. Returning to his studies in Rome, he was in St. Peter's Square when the newly elected Pope John Paul II emerged from the papal conclave of October 1978. Sartain earned a Licentiate of Sacred Theology with specialization in sacramental theology from the Pontifical University of St. Anselmo in 1979.

After returning to Memphis, Sartain was appointed as associate pastor of Our Lady of Sorrows Parish, where he remained for two years. He then served as director of vocations, chancellor, moderator of the curia, vicar for clergy, high school chaplain, and judge with the diocesan marriage tribunal. From 1992 to 2000, he served as pastor of St. Louis Parish in Memphis and vicar general of the diocese. Sartain served as diocesan administrator (1992–93) after Bishop Daniel M. Buechlein was named to head the Archdiocese of Indianapolis.

Bishop of Little Rock 
On January 4, 2000, Sartain was appointed the sixth bishop of the Diocese of Little Rock by Pope John Paul II. He received his episcopal consecration on March 6, 2000, from Archbishop Eusebius J. Beltran, with Bishops J. Terry Steib and Andrew Joseph McDonald serving as co-consecrators. Sartain was the first priest of the Diocese of Memphis to become a bishop. He selected as his episcopal motto: "Of You My Heart Has Spoken" Psalms 27:8.

Due to the increasing Hispanic population in Arkansas, Sartain took a course in Spanish in San Antonio, Texas, in 2001, and established Hispanic ministries throughout the state. He also ordained Arkansas's first Mexican-born priest and deacon. He worked to increase vocations; the diocese had ten seminarians and no ordinations in 2000, but fifteen seminarians and two ordinations in 2005. In 2005, Sartain led more than 5,000 Catholics in a bilingual Eucharistic Congress. During his tenure, the Catholic population in Arkansas rose from 90,600 to over 107,000.

Bishop of Joliet
On May 16, 2006, Sartain was appointed as bishop of the Diocese of Joliet by Pope Benedict VI. He was installed on June 27, 2006, in the Cathedral of St. Raymond Nonnatus in Joliet.

Sartain faced scrutiny while bishop of Joliet due to his handling of the sexual abuse crisis. During his ordination as archbishop of Seattle, the Survivors Network of those Abused by Priests (SNAP) organized a protest against Sartain's installation. The protest originated from Sartain's decision as bishop of Joliet to ordain Alejandro Flores in 2009, even though diocesan officials had raised concerns over Flores' viewing of male pornography. Shortly after his ordination, Flores was convicted of sexually abusing a boy and sentenced to four years in prison in 2010. SNAP said that Sartain's decision to ordain Flores and other such individuals showed that should not be entrusted as bishop.  In response, Sartain claims that he reported priests such as Flores as soon as he heard about abuse.

Archbishop of Seattle
On September 16, 2010, Sartain was appointed as archbishop of the Archdiocese of Seattle by Benedict XVI, succeeding Archbishop Alexander Brunett. Sartain was installed on December 1, 2010 in St. James Cathedral in Seattle. On November 15, 2011, Sartain was elected secretary of the United States Conference of Catholic Bishops (USCCB); he began a three-year term in November 2012. His position also made him chair of the USCCB Committee on Priorities and Plans.

On April 18, 2012, the Vatican announced the appointment of Sartain to oversee a review of the Leadership Conference of Women Religious, a prominent umbrella group for nuns in the United States. It involved reviewing and changing the group's laws, programs and practices to correct practices that were allegedly "incompatible with the Catholic faith."

On June 7, 2019, Sartain installed Paul D. Etienne, then Archbishop of Anchorage, as coadjutor archbishop for the archdiocese. On August 24, 2019, Sartain ordered the demolition of Holy Rosary Church in Tacoma, Washington, a building that has been on the City of Tacoma's Register of Tacoma Places since 1975. The church had become too dangerous to occupy, and estimates for its repair were at $18 million.

Retirement and legacy 
Pope Francis accepted Sartain's resignation as archbishop of Seattle on September 3, 2019. He was reported to be in poor health, which prompted the pope to accept his early retirement.

Viewpoints 
In April 2012, Sartain urged parishes in the archdiocese to collect signatures to place Referendum 74 on the November ballot. The referendum sought to repeal the State of Washington's newly enacted same-sex marriage statute. "The word 'marriage' isn't simply a label that can be attached to different types of relationships, Instead, 'marriage' reflects a deep reality – the reality of the unique, fruitful, lifelong union that is only possible between a man and a woman. There is nothing else like it, and it can't be defined or made into something that it isn't...Marriage can only be between a man and a woman because of its unique ends, purpose and place in society."

References

External links

Catholic Hierarchy: Archbishop James Peter Sartain
Archdiocese of Seattle

 

Living people
1952 births
People from Memphis, Tennessee
21st-century Roman Catholic archbishops in the United States
Roman Catholic archbishops of Seattle
Pontifical North American College alumni
Pontifical University of Saint Thomas Aquinas alumni
Roman Catholic bishops of Joliet in Illinois
Roman Catholic bishops of Little Rock
Catholics from Tennessee